Tennis at the 2013 European Youth Summer Olympic Festival was held at Olympic Sports Park, Utrecht, Netherlands from 15 to 19 July 2013.

Tennis had doubles and singles events for men and women competition.

Medalists

Medal table

References

2013 European Youth Summer Olympic Festival
European Youth Summer Olympic Festival
2013